Skřítek is a Czech comedy film. It was released in 2005. It could be called a "feature butcherly slapstick". Skřítek is a slapstick film, so the dialogues are substituted for interjections and all the sounds are stylised. Tomáš Vorel decided to film a slapstick film after several years as his debut in this genre was an episode in a Czech film Pražská pětka that was filmed in 1988.

External links
 

2005 films
2005 comedy films
Czech comedy films
2000s Czech films